A nuclear reactor core is the portion of a nuclear reactor containing the nuclear fuel components where the nuclear reactions take place and the heat is generated.  Typically, the fuel will be low-enriched uranium contained in thousands of individual fuel pins.  The core also contains structural components, the means to both moderate the neutrons and control the reaction, and the means to transfer the heat from the fuel to where it is required, outside the core.

Water-moderated reactors  
Inside the core of a typical pressurized water reactor or boiling water reactor are fuel rods with a diameter of a large gel-type ink pen, each about 4 m long, which are grouped by the hundreds in bundles called "fuel assemblies". Inside each fuel rod, pellets of uranium, or more commonly uranium oxide, are stacked end to end. Also inside the core are control rods, filled with pellets of substances like boron or hafnium or cadmium that readily capture neutrons. When the control rods are lowered into the core, they absorb neutrons, which thus cannot take part in the chain reaction. Conversely, when the control rods are lifted out of the way, more neutrons strike the fissile uranium-235 (U-235) or plutonium-239 (Pu-239) nuclei in nearby fuel rods, and the chain reaction intensifies. The core shroud, also located inside of the reactor, directs the water flow to cool the nuclear reactions inside of the core. The heat of the fission reaction is removed by the water, which also acts to moderate the neutron reactions.

Graphite-moderated reactors 

There are also graphite moderated reactors in use.

One type uses solid nuclear graphite for the neutron moderator and ordinary water for the coolant. See the Soviet-made RBMK nuclear-power reactor. This was the type of reactor involved in the Chernobyl disaster. 

In the Advanced Gas-cooled Reactor, a British design, the core is made of a graphite neutron moderator where the fuel assemblies are located. Carbon dioxide gas acts as a coolant and it circulates through the core, removing heat.

There have also been several experimental reactors that use graphite for moderation, such as the pebble bed reactor concepts and the molten-salt reactor experiment.

See also

Nuclear meltdown
Lists of nuclear disasters and radioactive incidents
Nuclear power
Nuclear reactor technology

References
Nuclear Reactor Analysis, John Wiley & Sons Canada, Ltd.

Nuclear power plant components
Nuclear technology